Speed Racer is a 1960s animated series.

Speed Racer may also refer to:

Film and television
 Speed Racer (film), a 2008 live-action film directed by the Wachowskis
 The New Adventures of Speed Racer, the 1993 animated television series
 Speed Racer X, the 1997 animated television series
 Speed Racer: The Next Generation, the 2008 animated television series

Games
 Speed Racer in The Challenge of Racer X by Accolade
 Speed Racer in My Most Dangerous Adventures, a video game for SNES by Radical Entertainment
 Speed Racer (1995 video game) by Namco
 Speed Racer (1996 video game) by Jaleco
 Speed Racer: The Videogame, a multi-platform game released in 2008 by Warner Bros. Interactive Entertainment

Music
 Speed Racer (soundtrack), an original soundtrack for the 2008 film
 "Speed Racer", a 1982 song by Devo
 "Speed Racer", a 2018 song by Masked Wolf
 "Speed Racer", a 2017 song by Her's